Amblyseius schusteri is a species of mite in the family Phytoseiidae.

References

schusteri
Articles created by Qbugbot
Animals described in 1959